The Carl H. Shier Farmhouse was built around 1900 in Dublin, Ohio, USA, replacing an older house on the property. The house is wood framed and L-shaped with gable roofs with slate construction. The same family has owned the property for over 100 years.

The house itself, the barn and chicken coop, also built around 1900, were all inducted into the National Register of Historic Places on April 11, 1979.

Future plans 
In 2018, the City of Dublin and Kaufman Development proposed to demolish the structures to create a new residential community to support the planned Innovation District in the area.

References 

Residential buildings on the National Register of Historic Places in Ohio
Dublin, Ohio